What.CD was a private, invitation only music BitTorrent tracker and community launched in 2007. The site was shut down on 17 November 2016, after a report that French authorities had seized the site's servers.

History
What.CD was founded on the day of Oink's Pink Palace's closure in October 2007. In November 2007, many site users received a hoax email purporting to be from the Recording Industry Association of America threatening to press charges for illegal downloads.

In 2008, the Canadian Recording Industry Association asked now-defunct Moxie Colo, then What.CD's host, to take down several tracker sites, including What.CD. The company refused, saying, "We will not be following the request and will be fighting for the rights of our clients as--to date--laws in Canada protect them." In October, the site released "The What CD Volume 2", a compilation album of artists that contributed to the site. Earlier that year, the site released Volume One.

In December 2008, What.CD and Open Your Eyes Records formed a partnership in which the record label would exclusively distribute new releases on the tracker.

In 2010, CNET.com reported that a teenage boy had gained access to playMPE.com (MPE meaning Music Protection by Encryption), an industry website used by music labels to share music with radio stations, by posing as an Australian music critic. He subsequently uploaded a number of unreleased albums to What.CD.

In September 2010, What.CD debuted a new lightweight and highly efficient tracker called "Ocelot." The lightweight tracker used only 3GB of RAM to power over five million peers.

In December 2010, What.CD's collection reached one million torrents, a record for a private BitTorrent tracker.

Throughout early 2014, the site was subject to a severe and prolonged DDoS attack, causing intermittent tracker downtime and limiting many of the site's services.

Shutdown 

On 17 November 2016, French authorities seized 12 servers from the internet service provider OVH in the north of France. Later, What.CD announced its closure on its index page and Twitter, saying, "Due to some recent events, What.CD is shutting down. We are not likely to return any time soon in our current form. All site and user data has been destroyed. So long, and thanks for all the fish," a reference to The Hitchhiker's Guide to the Galaxy. The site's Twitter account later posted the tweet "Reports of our database being seized are not factual".

On 18 November 2016, What.CD issued a statement about its shutdown, stating that its users and staff were safe, thanking all contributors and recommending that donations go to Internet Archive, Electronic Frontier Foundation, La Quadrature du Net and Initiative für Netzfreiheit.

In October 2017, for What.CD's ten-year anniversary, former What.CD staff released a torrent containing the last backup of all non-user data from the site, saying that this message would "likely be the last."

Leaks
The Radiohead song "These Are My Twisted Words" was uploaded to the tracker on 12 August 2009. Fans speculated the song had been leaked by the band itself and contained hints to an upcoming EP entitled "Wall of Ice." The song was freely released on 17 August 2009, on the band's website, similar to their release of In Rainbows.

In 2009, Microsoft's COFEE forensic tool was leaked on the site. Administrators later removed the software. The What.CD staff said of the removal: "Suddenly, we were forced to take a real look at the program, its source, and the potential impact on the site and security of our users and staff. And when we did, we didn't like what came of it. So, a decision was made. The torrent was removed (and it is not to be uploaded here again)." The leaked program is now available through several torrent sites and can be found on Wikileaks or Google.

On 28 November 2013, a What.CD user uploaded scans of three unpublished stories by American author J. D. Salinger. Similar to the response to the COFEE upload, an administrator removed the torrent. It is not clear how the unpublished material was obtained, as the original sources came from two different locations (the University of Texas and Princeton University), suggesting the works were obtained on separate occasions and later combined. These stories quickly spread over to other open BitTorrent sites, like The Pirate Bay, and image sharing sites, such as Imgur. What.CD staff said of the removal: "Due to this case’s rare and unlikely circumstances, due to the unnecessary and unwanted attention the Salinger leak has brought, and due to our desire to comply with the desires of the Salinger estate or other involved parties in this matter, the content has been removed from What.CD. It is not to be re-uploaded under any circumstances, and anyone found doing so will have their account disabled."

References

External links 
 
 A eulogy for What.cd, the greatest music collection in the history of the world—until it vanished, Nikhil Sonnad, 18 November 2016, Quartz.

Canadian music websites
Defunct BitTorrent websites
Internet properties established in 2007
Internet properties disestablished in 2016